Alfau is a surname. Notable people with the surname include:

Arturo Pellerano Alfau (1864–1935), Dominican merchant, publisher, and journalist
Felipe Alfau (1902–1999), Spanish-born American novelist and poet
Luis Ortiz Alfau (1916–2019), Basque militiaman

See also
Alfa (disambiguation)